Chinese Taipei is a nation that has competed at the Hopman Cup tournament on two occasions. The nation's first appearance came in 2008 when they qualified for the event by winning the second annual Asian Hopman Cup in 2007. They repeated this feat the following year by again winning the 2008 Asian Hopman Cup and going on to compete in the round robin stages of the main tournament in Australia. They also competed in the Asian Hopman Cup in 2006 and 2009, losing in the final in both years and thus missing out on a spot in the main event both times.

Players
This is a list of players who have played for Chinese Taipei in the Hopman Cup.

Results

1 In the final tie of 2009 against Italy, Lu was unable to play his singles match or the mixed doubles. This forfeited two points to Italy, contributing to their 3–0 defeat of Chinese Taipei.

References

Hopman Cup teams
Hopman Cup
Hopman Cup